Tom McIntosh is the head men's soccer coach at the University of Tulsa. He has coached the team since 1995, and has posted a 167–108–23 career record, making him the school's all-time winningest coach. He has posted ten 10 win seasons, including a school record 16 in 2008. The 2008 squad saw the team reach a school record national ranking of 5. He has led Tulsa to three consecutive Conference USA regular season and tournament titles the past three seasons. He has led the team to the NCAA tournament in three out of the past five seasons. From 1989 to 1991, he was an assistant coach at Tulsa.

He played college soccer at Tulsa himself from 1986 to 1988. In 1989, he played for the Tulsa Renegades.

References

External links
 Tulsa bio

Living people
American soccer coaches
American soccer players
Tulsa Golden Hurricane men's soccer coaches
Tulsa Golden Hurricane men's soccer players
Tulsa Renegades players
USISL players
1966 births
Association football midfielders
Soccer players from Milwaukee
Sportspeople from Milwaukee
Soccer players from Oklahoma
Sportspeople from Tulsa, Oklahoma